Heart Series 2 is a soap opera which aired on SCTV. The show is produced by Servia. Players such as Yuki Kato, Adipati Dolken, Pamela Bowie, Sahila Hisham, Aditya Suryo and Kevin Julio.

Cast
 Yuki Kato as Rachel
 Olivia Jensen as Olivia
 Adipati Dolken as Fahrel
 Pamela Bowie as Luna
 Unique Priscilla as Rahayu
 Astri Nurdin as Marissa
 Ponco Buwono as Yuda
 Ikang Fauzi as Adam
 Sylvia Fully as Sarah
 Sahila Hisyam as Vandra
 Vanessa Angel as Yunita
 Kevin Julio as Boy

History
The band "The Rocketz" played in a school event. Farel member band (Adipati Dolken), Bevan (Aditya Suryo) and Endo (Joshua Otay) managed to make their high school female students in hysterics at his appearance. When finished performing, the girls scramble to give gifts to the band. However, the manager, Rachel (Yuki Kato), only allowing the students to give gifts to Bevan and Endo. Farel who feel that they are the ones who are idolized was puzzled why he did not get a gift at all.

Farel, Rachel, Bevan and Endo briefly as four people who were good friends like friends. Rachel likes Farel since they are friends from childhood. But Farel was never aware of it. Likewise with the ignorant and slengekan Endo. Bevan's just the start feeling suspicious of Rachel on Farel.

Meanwhile, the figure Vandra (Sahila Hisham), a beautiful girl, rich and sexy at the school, was jealous of Rachel ever closer to Farel. Though Bevan and Endo infatuated with Vandra. Vandra like Farel. Farel did not like her. Vandra including the arrogant and cocky girls pretty antagonistic.

On the other hand, Luna (Pamela Bowie) forced to live in Singapore with his father, Adam (Ikang Fawzi), for treatment. Luna always secretly monitor Farel through YouTube, Twitter or Facebook. Farel himself did not realize that Luna was still watching him from across the country. When returning to Indonesia, he has a homeschooling teacher named Mrs. Sarah (Sylvia Fully) Adam preferred.

Suddenly, there came home that Rachel is his own father and his own twin sister Olivia (Olivia Jensen), Rachel fell off a cliff and was hospitalized, while Luna was in need of a donor liver, Rachel heart it was donate her heart to Luna, as Rachel Farel and Luna would like to see happy. Rachel not died and was replaced by his twin sister is Olivia. Olivia wants to continue the desire to unify Farel and Rachel, Luna.

Indonesian television soap operas
2013 Indonesian television series debuts
2013 Indonesian television series endings
SCTV (TV network) original programming